Kilcleagh is a civil parish in County Westmeath, Ireland.

Kilcleagh is one of 4 civil parishes in the barony of Clonlonan in the Province of Leinster.

Kilcleagh civil parish comprises part of the town of Moate and 65 townlands: Aghafin, Aghanargit, Agharanny, Agharevagh East, Agharevagh West, Aghavoneen, Aghnasullivan, Attimurtagh, Ballinlassy, Ballycahillroe, Ballydonagh, Ballynahown, Ballynahownwood, Ballynakill, Ballynamuddagh, Ballyscarvan, Baltrasna, Blackories, Boggagh (Conran), Boggagh (Fury), Boggagh (Malone), Boggagh Eighter, Bolinarra, Bolyconor, Boyanagh (Earl), Boyanagh (Malone), Cartronkeel, Cartrons, Castletown, Clonaltra (King), Clonaltra West, Clonlonan, Clonmore, Clonydonnin, Cregganmacar, Curraghbeg, Curries, Fardrum, Farnagh, Farranmanny North, Farranmanny South, Fearmore, Glebe East, Glebe West, Gorteen, Hall, Kilbillaghan, Kilcleagh, Kilgarvan, Kilgarvan Glebe, Kill, Killogeenaghan, Killomenaghan, Knockanea, Lowerwood, Moategranoge, Moneen, Newcastle, Ories, Scroghil, Seeoge, Sheean, Toorydonnellan, Tubbrit and Tullanageeragh.

The neighbouring civil parishes are: Ballyloughloe to the north, Kilmanaghan to the east, Clonmacnoise and Lemanaghan (both County Offaly) to the south and St. Mary's to the west.

References

External links
Kilcleagh civil parish at the IreAtlas Townland Data Base
Kilcleagh civil parish at townlands.ie
Kilcleagh civil parish at The Placenames Database of Ireland

Civil parishes of County Westmeath